General elections were held in Sweden on 19 September 1948. Despite a campaign by a large part of the Swedish press against socializing insurances, controlled foreign trade and rationing regulations still in use since the war, freshman Prime Minister and Social Democratic leader Tage Erlander managed to defeat the People's Party-led opposition under Bertil Ohlin by a higher election turnout. He maintained his government with only minor losses and the Swedish Social Democratic Party remained the largest party, winning 112 of the 230 seats in the Andra kammaren of the Riksdag. Erlander was to stay on as Prime Minister until 1969.

Results

References

General elections in Sweden
Sweden
General
Sweden